The men's T36 100 metres competition of the athletics events at the 2015 Parapan American Games was held on August 10 at the CIBC Athletics Stadium. The defending Parapan American Games champion was José Florez of Colombia.

Records
Prior to this competition, the existing records were as follows:

Broken Records

Schedule
All times are Central Standard Time (UTC-6).

Results
All times are shown in seconds.

Final
Wind +0.1 m/s

References

Athletics at the 2015 Parapan American Games